L'ŒIL (French: The Eye) is a French magazine created by Rosamond Bernier (née Rosenbaum) and her second husband, Georges Bernier, in 1955 to celebrate and reflect contemporary art creation.

References

External links
 
 L'ŒIL retrospective by Tim Groen
 L'ŒIL at Artclair.com
 Brooklyn Rail In Conversation Rosamond Bernier with Phong Bui

1955 establishments in France
French art publications
Contemporary art magazines
French-language magazines
Magazines established in 1955